Miss Russia 2019 was the 27th Miss Russia pageant, held in the concert hall Barvikha Luxury Village in Moscow on 13 April 2019. Fifty contestants from across Russia competed for the crown. The competition was hosted by Maxim Privalov and Ksenia Sukhinova. Yulia Polyachikhina of Chuvashia crowned her successor Alina Sanko of Azov at the end of the event. Sanko represented Russia at the Miss World 2019 pageant where she placed Top 12, and also represented Russia at Miss Universe 2020 pageant, where she unplaced.

Results

Placements

Special awards

Contestants

Jury
Igor Chapurin – fashion designer
Oxana Fedorova – television presenter, Miss Russia 2001
Tatiana Kotova – singer and Miss Russia 2006
Vladimir Matetsky – composer, producer, and radio presenter
DJ Smash – DJ and music producer

References

External links

2019 beauty pageants
2019 in Moscow
April 2019 events in Russia
Miss Russia